Sean Fingleton (born 1950) is an Irish artist who works mainly in oil and is noted for Irish landscapes and seascapes.

Biography
Fingleton was born in County Donegal in 1950. He studied at University College Dublin, where he earned a BA in Philosophy and English Studies. He also received an H.Dip in Higher Education and learned art at Letterkenny RTC and the National College of Art and Design.

Fingleton received the Royal Hibernian Academy’s Fergus O'Ryan award in 1983 and the Guinness Peat Aviation award for emerging artists in 1986. He was inducted the Aosdána academy of artists. Two of his works are in the collection of the Irish Museum of Modern Art. His painting, Coastal Scene, is part of the European Parliament art collection in Strasbourg. His work is also on display at the Royal Hospital in Gloucester in England, and Aras an Uachtarain.

References 

1950 births
Living people
20th-century Irish painters
21st-century Irish painters
Irish male painters
Aosdána members
Alumni of University College Dublin
Alumni of Letterkenny Institute of Technology
Alumni of the National College of Art and Design
20th-century Irish male artists